Paul Stanley Taylor  (born 28 March 1953) is an Anglican priest and was Archdeacon of Sherborne in the Diocese of Salisbury until his 24 May 2018 retirement, when he became Archdeacon Emeritus.

He was educated at Westminster College, Oxford and Westcott House, Cambridge. He holds both the B.Ed. and M.Th. degrees from the University of Oxford. He was ordained deacon in 1984; and priest in 1985, in the Diocese of London. Following a curacy at St Stephen, Bush Hill Park he held incumbencies in  Southgate and Hendon. He was Director of Post Ordination Training for the Edmonton Area of London Diocese and Area Dean of West Barnet. He was collated as Archdeacon of Sherborne by the Bishop of Salisbury in July 2004 and made Canon and Prebendary of Salisbury Cathedral in September of the same year.

He has an ongoing involvement in clergy wellbeing, serving as a trustee of St. Luke's Healthcare for the Clergy. He is also captain of the Church of England Golf Team.

Paul was married to Janet for over 36 years; Janet died of cancer on 29 January 2021 aged 57. They have three sons, Joe, Matt, and Ben.

References

1953 births
Alumni of Westcott House, Cambridge
Archdeacons of Sherborne
Living people
Alumni of Westminster College, Oxford